The Hampshire Cricket Board was formed in 1996, and competed in the MCCA Knockout Trophy between 1998 and 2002.  They have appeared in eight List A matches, making four NatWest Trophy and four Cheltenham & Gloucester Trophy appearances.  The players in this list have all played at least one List A match.  Hampshire Cricket Board cricketers who have not represented the Board in List A cricket are excluded from the list.

Players are listed in order of appearance, where players made their debut in the same match, they are ordered by batting order.  Players in bold have played first-class cricket.

Key

List of players

List A captains

See also
 Hampshire Cricket Board

References

External links 
 List A matches played by the Hampshire Cricket Board at CricketArchive

Hampshire
Cricketers